Christopher's House is a 1979 Swedish drama film directed by Lars Lennart Forsberg. It competed in the Un Certain Regard section at the 1980 Cannes Film Festival.

Cast
 Thommy Berggren - Kristoffer
 Agneta Eckemyr - Hanna
 Börje Ahlstedt - Börje
 Mimi Pollak - Grandma
 Gunnel Broström - The Mother
 Pia Garde - The Sick Girl
 Majlis Granlund - The Sick Girl's Mother
 Linda Megner - Frida
 Birgitta Andersson - Helena Sandholm
 Per Oscarsson - Kräftan
 Silvija Bardh - Siri
 Stig Ossian Ericson - Stenkil
 Gunnar Friberg - Journalist
 Marie Göranzon - Mona
 Sten Johan Hedman - Leif

References

External links

1979 films
1970s Swedish-language films
1979 drama films
Films scored by Björn Isfält
Swedish drama films
1970s Swedish films